Põlva County ( or Põlvamaa) is one of 15 counties of Estonia. It is situated in south-eastern part of the country and borders Tartu, Valga and Võru counties.  23,989 people live in Põlva County – constituting 1.8% of the total population in Estonia (as of 2022).

Government 
The County Government (Estonian: Maavalitsus) is led by the Governor (Estonian: maavanem), who is appointed by the Government of Estonia for a term of five years. Since 2007, the Governor position is held by Priit Sibul.

Municipalities 
The county is subdivided into municipalities. There are 3 rural municipalities ( – parishes) in Põlva County.

Demographics 
27,028 people live in Põlva County – constituting 2.1% of the total population in Estonia (as of January 2013).

Religion

Gallery

References

External links 

 
Counties of Estonia